The Ewenny Road drill hall is a former military installation in Maesteg, Bridgend, Wales.

History
The building was designed as the headquarters of the Glamorgan Yeomanry and was completed in the early 20th century. The regiment was mobilised at the drill hall in August 1914 before being deployed to Egypt. After the war the drill hall was decommissioned and converted for industrial use.

References

Drill halls in Wales
Maesteg